Maaike van Klink (born 8 April 2000) is a Dutch footballer who plays as goalkeeper for ADO Den Haag in the Eredivisie.

Club career

International career

Personal life
van Klink was born in Leidschendam.

Honours

Club

International

References

Living people
Dutch women's footballers
Eredivisie (women) players
2000 births
People from Leidschendam
Women's association football goalkeepers
ADO Den Haag (women) players
Footballers from South Holland